Prodromou is a Greek surname. It is the genitive form of prodromos, which means forerunner.

Notable people with this surname include:

 Anna Prodromou (born 1972), Cypriot communication consultant, journalist, speaker and educator
 Evan Prodromou (born 1968), American software developer
 Andreas Prodromou, flight attendant in the Helios Airways Flight 522 accident
 Peter Prodromou (born 1969), British engineer
 Stav Prodromou (born 1944), Greek businessman

References